Wilsford may refer to:


Places

England
 Wilsford, Lincolnshire, village and civil parish
 Wilsford, Wiltshire, village and civil parish in the Vale of Pewsey
 Wilsford, village in Wilsford cum Lake parish, Wiltshire, near Amesbury

United States
 Wilsford (Lula, Georgia), listed on the NRHP in Georgia

People with the surname
 James Wilsford (c.1516–1550), English soldier and politician

See also